Argyle House may refer to:

 Argyle House, Albany, a heritage-listed house in Western Australia
 Argyle House, Millers Point, a heritage-listed house in Sydney, New South Wales, Australia
 Argyle House, Newcastle, a heritage-listed house in New South Wales, Australia
 Argyle House School, a school in England

See also
 Argyll House, a historic property in London